Laquipampa Wildlife Refuge is a protected area in the region of Lambayeque, Peru. It protects tropical dry forests, habitat of the white-winged guan and the spectacled bear.

Ecology

Flora 
Among the trees found in this protected area are: Tara spinosa, Loxopterygium huasango, Bursera graveolens, Eriotheca ruizii, etc.

Fauna
Some of the birds found in this area are: the white-winged guan, the Piura chat-tyrant, the bearded guan, the Andean condor, the blue seedeater, etc.

Some mammals found in this area are: the spectacled bear, the Southern tamandua, the white-tailed deer, the Guayaquil squirrel, etc.

See also

 Spectacled Bear Conservation Society - Peru

References

External links 

 Profile at protectedplanet.net

Protected areas of Peru
Protected areas established in 1982
Geography of Lambayeque Region
1982 establishments in Peru
Tourist attractions in Lambayeque Region